OHM (sometimes stylized Ohm: or OHM:) is an American instrumental rock/jazz fusion power trio group fronted by former Megadeth guitarist Chris Poland and featuring bassist Robertino "Pag" Pagliari. The band was formed in 1998 and has released four studio albums and a live album. OHM also records occasionally as "OHMphrey," a larger ensemble but anchored by Poland and Pagliari.

The band often performs at the Baked Potato jazz club in Studio City, Los Angeles, which is a neighborhood of Los Angeles. On May 21, 2016, drummer Nick Menza died from heart failure while performing on stage with OHM at the Baked Potato jazz club.

OHMphrey

OHMphrey is an American instrumental collaborative group formed in January 2008. An offshoot of the band OHM, OHMphrey features three members of the Chicago-based progressive rock jam band Umphrey's McGee (guitarist Jake Cinninger, keyboardist Joel Cummins and drummer Kris Myers) as well as former Megadeth guitarist Chris Poland and bassist Robertino Pagliari. They have released two studio albums.

Discography

As OHM 
2002: OHM:
2004: "Live" on KPFK 90.7 FM
2006: Amino Acid Flashback
2008: Circus of Sound
2012: Tsunami Jams

As OHMphrey 
2009: OHMphrey
2012: Posthaste

References

External links 
http://www.officialohm.com
Official Facebook page
OHMphrey band profile at Magna Carta Records

Jazz fusion ensembles
American progressive metal musical groups
American instrumental musical groups
Musical groups established in 1998
Musical groups established in 2008
Magna Carta Records artists